Ptenidium is a genus of beetles belonging to the family Ptiliidae.

The genus has cosmopolitan distribution.

Species:
 Ptenidium aprinum Peyerimhoff, 1917 
 Ptenidium azafady Darby, 2014

References

Ptiliidae